Kalindi Commerford (born 18 November 1994) is an Australian field hockey player.

Commerford was born in Bowral, New South Wales, and made her senior international debut in a test series against New Zealand at the 2016 Trans-Tasman Trophy in Auckland, New Zealand.

She grew up in Milton, New South Wales and played her junior hockey on the south coast of NSW. She started in Nowra with the Ulladulla Jets playing with her brothers. At the age of 11 she began playing with Wollongong University and Jamberoo Hockey Club. She represented South Coast at State Champs.

References

External links
 
 
 

1994 births
Living people
Australian female field hockey players
Female field hockey forwards
People from Bowral
Sportswomen from New South Wales
21st-century Australian women